"Get Stoned" is a song by American rock band Hinder. It was released in July 2005 as the lead single from their debut album, Extreme Behavior. It peaked at number 4 on the Billboard Mainstream Rock Tracks chart in the United States.

Charts

Certifications

Release history

References

2005 debut singles
2005 songs
Hinder songs
Songs written by Austin John Winkler
Songs written by Brian Howes
Songs written by Joey Moi
Songs written by Cody Hanson
Universal Republic Records singles